Mahaban (also Romanized as Maḥabān) is a village in Marz Rural District, Chah Dadkhoda District, Qaleh Ganj County, Kerman Province, Iran. At the 2006 census, its population was 62, in 13 families.

References 

Populated places in Qaleh Ganj County